Oxyopes elegans is a species of lynx spiders (family Oxyopidae) found in Queensland and New South Wales.

References

External links 
 Oxyopes elegans at the World Spider Catalog

Oxyopidae
Spiders described in 1878
Spiders of Australia
Arthropods of Queensland
Fauna of New South Wales